Gaines Township is the name of some places in the U.S. state of Michigan:

 Gaines Township, Genesee County, Michigan
 Gaines Township, Kent County, Michigan (also known as Gaines Charter Township, Michigan)

See also
 Gaines, Michigan

Michigan township disambiguation pages